Gerrhonotus lugoi, Lugo's alligator lizard, is a species of lizard of the Anguidae family. It is found in Mexico.

References

Gerrhonotus
Reptiles of Mexico
Reptiles described in 1970
Taxa named by Clarence John "Jack" McCoy